Aleppo Governorate ( / ALA-LC: Muḥāfaẓat Ḥalab / ) is one of the fourteen governorates of Syria. It is the most populous governorate in Syria with a population of more than 4,867,000 (2011 Est.), almost 23% of the total population of Syria. The capital is the city of Aleppo.

History

Ancient
In Classical Antiquity, the region was made up of three regions: Chalybonitis (with its centre at Chalybon or Aleppo), Chalcidice (with its center at Qinnasrīn العيس), and Cyrrhestica (with its center at Cyrrhus النبي حوري). This was the most fertile and populated region in Syria. Under the Romans the region was made in 193 CE part of the province of Coele Syria or Magna Syria, which was ruled from Antioch. The province of Euphratensis was established in the 4th century CE in the east, its centre was Hierapolis Bambyce (Manbij).

Under the Rashidun and Umayyad Muslim dynasties, the region was part of the Jund Qinnasrin. In the Abbasid period the region was under the independent rule of the Hamdanids. The Mamluks and then later the Ottomans governed the area until 1918; under the Ottomans, the region was part of the Vilayet of Aleppo.

Modern history

During the Tanzimat era of Ottoman governance in Aleppo, the authorities established the 1858 land reform law along with schemes to introduce new Bedouin settlers to northern Syria. These programs led to a stronger integration of Aleppo with the economy of the Ottoman heartland in Anatolia. It also paved the way for European capitalists to exploit agricultural resources of the region and caused internal trade to shift into the hands of European merchants.

In the early 20th century, during the French Mandate the region was part of the short-lived State of Aleppo.

Aleppo Governorate formerly included Idlib Governorate, until the latter was split off circa 1960.

Syrian Civil War (2011-present)

The governorate has been the scene of some of the fiercest fighting in the Syrian Civil War. In June 2017, nearly six years after the war's start, the province was almost equally divided between Syrian Government forces, Syrian Opposition forces, Turkish Army /TFSA  and the Rojava/Syrian Democratic Forces. After fierce fighting, the Syrian Arab Army with Russian air support managed to take control of the capital of the Governorate, Aleppo, in December 2016 from Fatah Halab coalition.

In August 2016, the Turkish Army, backed by the Free Syrian Army launched the Operation Euphrates Shield in order to drive ISIL from the border towns of Jarablus, A'zaz and Al-Bab. The operation resulted in success and starting in May 2017, the region is now under Turkish occupation. The Islamic State of Iraq and the Levant was largely removed from the area after the Syrian Arab Army launched the East Aleppo Offensive, the Maskanah Plains offensive, and the Southern Raqqa Offensive.

In January 2018, the Turkish army backed by the Free Syrian Army launched the Turkish military operation in Afrin against the YPG, which resulted in the capture of the city of Afrin and the entire Afrin District.

Geography
To the east lies Raqqa Governorate, to the south Ḥamā Governorate, and to the west Idlib Governorate and Turkey's Hatay Province.

The governorate lies on a plateau known as the Aleppo plateau. The eastern and northern boundaries of the governorate correspond roughly to the eastern and northern boundaries of the plateau, although the northeastern portion of the governorate crosses the Euphrates valley into the Jazīrah plateau. The southeastern end of the governorate is continuous with the arid steppe of the northern Syrian Desert. To the south lie the eastern plains of Hama, and to the southwest lie the northern plains of Idlib.

The surface gradually slopes down in north-south and west-east directions, undulating gently with an amplitude of 10–30 m for each wave. The lowlands are covered with combined Paleozoic and Mesozoic sediments that average 4–5 km in thickness over the whole surface.

Starting from the valley of the Euphrates, the terrain rises forming the Manbij plain, and then sinks again at the Dhahab river valley in the east of Aleppo Governorate. The Dhahab drains the highlands north of Bāb and runs in a north-south direction for about  until it drains into Lake Jabboul. West of the Dhahab valley the terrain rises again forming Mount ʻAqīl (Mount Taymar) west of Bāb and Mount Ḥaṣṣ west of Lake Jabboul. The terrain sinks again forming the valley of River Quwēq. The endpoint of Quwēq, the Maṭkh swamp, is the lowest point in Aleppo Governorate. West of the Quwēq is Mount Simeon. South of Mount Simeon is the plains of Idlib. The River ʻAfrīn runs west of Mount Simeon. To the west of River ʻAfrīn the land rises again forming Mount Kurd. The highest point in the governorate, Mount Bulbul, is located in the northern part of Mount Kurd. River ʻIfrīn runs from north to south between Mount Simeon and Mount Kurd and then turns west to the Orontes valley, thus separating Mount Kurd from Mount Ḥārim to the south.

The main trees are Aleppo Pine and oak.

Arable land makes up 66% of the total area in the governorate. The main crops are olives, figs, plums, pomegranates, vegetables, grains, rice, and pistachios. Pistachio is called in Syria fustuq Ḥalabī (Aleppo pistachio). Rivers traditionally supported agriculture; the main rivers in Aleppo are the Quwēq, ʻIfrīn, Sājūr, Dhahab, Aswad, and Euphrates. However, all of these rivers arise in Turkey, and due to irrigation projects on the Turkish side of the border, the flow of these rivers dropped so much that most of them could no longer support agriculture. The Quwēq, for example, dried up completely in the 1950s. The vanishing of the rivers forced farmers to depend largely on rainfall and on water diverted from the Euphrates. A pumping station at Maskanah (95 km east of Aleppo) provides drinking water for Aleppo from the Euphrates. Recently Euphrates water has been diverted to revive the dead Qwēq river, and thus revive agriculture in the plains south of Aleppo. Urban areas, highlands, swamps, forests, and grazing land make up 34% of the total area of the governorate. The remaining 14% is a desert area in the southeast that is continuous with the Syrian Desert and known as the Aleppo Desert (Arabic: بادية حلب).

Lake Assad (the largest lake in Syria) separates Aleppo Governorate from Raqqa Governorate. Other artificial lakes include the Lake of 17 April on the River ʻIfrīn and the revived Shabāʼ Lake on River Quwēq.

Archaeological sites are abundant in the governorate, especially at Mount Simeon in the west and the plains that extend beyond towards Antioch and Idlib. This region, known as the Limestone Massif, has the largest concentration of Late Antiquity churches in the world, with a unique Syrian architectural style. It also has the famous Dead Cities of Syria.

Cities

The following cities are the administrative centres of the districts in Aleppo Governorate (Population based on 2004 official census):

Districts

The governorate is divided into ten districts (manatiq) as of 2011. The districts are further divided into 46 sub-districts (nawahi):

 Mount Simeon District (7 sub-districts)*
 Mount Simeon Subdistrict
 Tell ad-Daman Subdistrict
 Haritan Subdistrict
 Darat Izza Subdistrict
 al-Zirbah Subdistrict
 Zammar Subdistrict
 Hadher Subdistrict
 Afrin District (7 sub-districts)
 Afrin Subdistrict
 Bulbul Subdistrict
 Jindires Subdistrict
 Rajo Subdistrict
 Sharran Subdistrict
 Shaykh al-Hadid Subdistrict
 Maabatli Subdistrict
 Atarib District (3 sub-districts)**
 Atarib Subdistrict
 Ibbin Samaan Subdistrict
 Urum al-Kubrah Subdistrict
 Ayn al-Arab District (4 sub-districts)
 Ayn al-Arab Subdistrict
 Shuyukh Tahtani Subdistrict
 Sarrin Subdistrict
 Al-Jalabiyah Subdistrict

 Azaz District (6 sub-districts)
 Azaz Subdistrict
 Akhtarin Subdistrict
 Tell Rifaat Subdistrict
 Mare' Subdistrict
 Nubl Subdistrict
 Sawran Subdistrict
 Al-Bab District (4 sub-districts)
 al-Bab Subdistrict
 Tadef Subdistrict
 al-Rai Subdistrict
 Arima Subdistrict
 Dayr Hafir District (3 sub-districts)***
 Dayr Hafir Subdistrict
 Rasm Harmil al-Imam Subdistrict
 Kuweires Sharqi Subdistrict
 Jarabulus District (2 sub-districts)
 Jarabulus Subdistrict
 Ghandoura Subdistrict
 Manbij District (5 sub-districts)
 Manbij Subdistrict
 Abu Kahf Subdistrict
 Abu Qilqil Subdistrict
 al-Khafsah Subdistrict
 Maskanah Subdistrict
 Safirah District (5 sub-districts)
 as-Safira Subdistrict
 Tell Aran Subdistrict
 Khanasir Subdistrict
 Banan Subdistrict
 al-Hajib Subdistrict

* - includes Aleppo City
** - a newly-created district since 2008, formerly belonging to Mount Simeon District
*** - a newly-created district since 2009, formerly belonging to Al-Bab District

Climate
Aleppo Governorate has a semi-arid climate. The mountain series that runs along the Mediterranean coast, namely Mount Alawites and Mount Amanus, largely block the effects of the Mediterranean on climate (rain shadow effect). Snow is usually in winter. The average humidity is 60% in the west and 55% in the east.

Economy 
Agricultural output from Aleppo mainly focuses on cereal and cotton production. However, since the Syrian Civil War, many Aleppo based commerce have now relocated across the border into Turkey, especially Gaziantep. Economic conditions have deteriorated in the Aleppo region and have caused prices of goods to rise. The war in Ukraine and reductions in the Euphrates' river water levels are expected to cause a major impact on water and electricity access as well as food security within the region.

Population
As per the 2004 Syrian census the population was 4,045,200. A 2011 UNOCHA estimate put the population at 4,867,900, though this has likely changed since the start of the war.

References

 
Governorates of Syria